Robbery is a 1967 British crime film directed by Peter Yates and starring Stanley Baker. The story is a heavily fictionalised version of the 1963 Great Train Robbery. The film was produced by Stanley Baker and Michael Deeley, for Baker's company Oakhurst Productions.

Plot
A criminal gang uses a gas canister to knock out the occupant of a car and then bundle him into a stolen ambulance. There they cut free a briefcase full of jewellery. Shortly afterward, when the criminals are changing vehicles, they are spotted by the police and a high-speed chase develops with the criminals getting away.

Using the money from this job, crime boss Paul Clifton (Stanley Baker) builds up a team to hit a Royal Mail train coming south from Glasgow. A meticulous plan is put in place, but there are obstacles: Jack (Clinton Greyn), the driver of the getaway car in the jewellery theft, is identified in an identity parade and arrested (but refuses to name accomplices to police); gang member Robinson (Frank Finlay) has to be broken out of prison; and Inspector George Langdon (James Booth) is hot on the trail of the jewel robbers, and finds out through informers about plans for an even bigger heist.

The gang gathers to do the job and change the signals to stop the train and escape with the cash. In the morning, Langdon and the police investigate the crime scene and explore possible local hideouts, including a disused airbase where the robbers are hiding in the basement, but are not found.

The cash is divided up and the getaway vehicles hidden at a scrapyard. Members wait in turn to take their share to Switzerland. However, the paid-off scrapyard man is arrested at an airport and found with banknotes from the raid and confesses. Police then arrest some of gang as they retrieve cars at the scrapyard. This leads the police back to the airfield, where they arrest further gang members.

Clifton evades capture. He places his cut of the money on a private plane and is last seen disembarking at New York with a different identity.

Cast

Production
Michael Deeley bought the rights to Peta Fordham's book based on the 'Great Train Robbery' of 1963. He and director Peter Yates offered the project to Woodfall Film Productions, where Deeley worked, but the company did not want to make it. Deeley and Yates then approached Stanley Baker to star in the film. Baker had a good relationship with Joseph E. Levine, whose Embassy Pictures agreed to fund the movie.

To avoid legal problems, it was decided to write a script where the details in the 25-minute robbery sequence were taken entirely from court evidence, but the remainder of the film would be fictitious speculation. "We had to make sure there was no risk of accidental identification with anyone", said Baker. "The characters involved in the film are in no way based on the characters who took part in the great train robbery."

Vanessa Redgrave was approached to play Stanley Baker's wife, but turned down the role. Joseph Levine requested that the story be changed to include an American mastermind behind the robbery, to ensure the movie would appeal to American audiences. Three days of scenes were shot featuring Jason Robards in this role on Long Island, using Levine's own yacht. However, after this was done it was decided not to use the footage.

George Raft was to have played a role in the film, but was unable to do so after being refused entry into London.

The movie was shot entirely on location in early 1967 and contains much period footage of central London, including shots of Marble Arch, Trafalgar Square, Little Venice and Kensal Green. Shots of the gang meeting up prior to the robbery were filmed at Leyton Orient Football Club during a match with Swindon Town. The gang's airfield hideout was filmed at RAF Graveley. Filming was even done at New York Harbor and Arbour Hill Prison in Dublin. The robbery itself was shot to the east of Theddingworth.

Reception
According to Michael Deeley the film did "good business" on release. It was not a big hit in the US; Peter Yates called it "very poorly exploited". The film won the best original British screenplay award (for Edward Boyd, Peter Yates, and George Markstein) from the Writers Guild of Great Britain.

The critical response to Robbery over the years was summarized by Peter Elliott in 2014: "Robbery was praised by a number of critics upon its release. ... However, time and culture have not been kind to Yates' film, and it has, to a very large extent, been relegated to a footnote in British crime cinema." Beyond critical opinion, the location-shot car chase at the beginning of the film has been very influential. It was seen by Steve McQueen, and led him and producer Philip D'Antoni to approve Yates as the director of Bullitt (1968). The car chase in Bullitt has been called "revolutionary" and "one of the most exciting car chases in film history".

Home media
Robbery was released on DVD for the first time in 2008. Before this, the only copies in circulation had been from a VHS release in the 1980s.

In August 2015, a remastered version was released on Blu-ray and DVD, scanned at 2K and fully restored to its original aspect ratio, along with some special features.

References
Notes

Bibliography

External links
 
 

1967 films
1967 crime drama films
1960s heist films
British crime drama films
British heist films
Crime films based on actual events
Drama films based on actual events
Films directed by Peter Yates
Films set in London
Rail transport films
1960s English-language films
1960s British films